Pedro Canário is a municipality located in the Brazilian state of Espírito Santo. Its population was 26,381 (2020) and its area is 434 km².

References

Municipalities in Espírito Santo